Karpniki  is a village in the administrative district of Gmina Mysłakowice, within Jelenia Góra County, Lower Silesian Voivodeship, in south-western Poland.

The village is the site of a 15th-century castle that was redecorated in a Neogothic style in 1844 according to the plans of Friedrich August Stüler for Prince Wilhelm of Prussia who had purchased the estate in 1822. His brother, King Frederick William III, visited him several times and in 1831 bought nearby Erdmannsdorf Estate for himself, and in 1839 Wojanów (Schildau) Castle for his daughter Princess Louise of the Netherlands. Jelenia Góra Valley became a royal hideaway. The prince's daughter, Marie of Prussia, had her confirmation in the Lutheran Fischbach church in the spring of 1842, with King Frederick William IV and his wife Elisabeth Ludovika of Bavaria being present, as well as their nephew, the Bavarian Crown Prince and later King Maximilian II, Marie's fiancé, whom she married later that year. The following year their first son was born, who became the famous king Ludwig II.

See also
 Castles in Poland

Karpniki